Robin James Backhaus (born February 12, 1955) is an American former competition swimmer, Olympic medalist, and former world record-holder.

Backhaus represented the United States as a 17-year-old at the 1972 Summer Olympics in Munich, Germany.  He won a bronze medal for his third-place performance in the men's 200-meter butterfly, finishing with a time of 2:03.23 behind Mark Spitz and Gary Hall, and completing an American sweep of the event.

At the 1973 World Aquatics Championships in Belgrade, Yugoslavia, he won gold medals for his first-place finish in the 200-meter butterfly, and as a member of the winning U.S. team in the 4×200-meter freestyle relay.  He also received a bronze medal third for finishing in the 100-meter butterfly.  

Domestically Backhaus won three AAU titles, in the 200 yd butterfly indoors in 1973–74, and in the 100 m butterfly in 1973. He also won NCAA titles in the 200 butterfly in 1974–75. After retiring from competitions Backhaus worked as a teacher and coach at Konawaena High School in Hawaii for four years, and then trained swimmers in Texas and California for over 20 years.

See also
 List of Olympic medalists in swimming (men)
 List of University of Alabama people
 List of World Aquatics Championships medalists in swimming (men)
 World record progression 4 × 200 metres freestyle relay

References

1955 births
Living people
Alabama Crimson Tide men's swimmers
American male butterfly swimmers
American male freestyle swimmers
Olympic bronze medalists for the United States in swimming
Sportspeople from Lincoln, Nebraska
Swimmers at the 1972 Summer Olympics
World Aquatics Championships medalists in swimming
Medalists at the 1972 Summer Olympics